Robert Dennis "Bobbie" Goulding (born 4 February 1972), also known by the nickname of "Bobbie Dazzler", is an English former professional rugby league footballer, and coach, who played in the 1980s, 1990s, 2000s and 2010s, and has coached in the 2000s and 2010s.

Background
Goulding was born in Widnes, Lancashire, England, and he is the father of the rugby league footballer; Bobbie Goulding Jr.

Playing career
Goulding made his senior début for Wigan at the age of 16, scoring a try in a 20–16 victory over Halifax. In 1990, he became the youngest ever Great Britain Lions tourist at 18 years of age. In 1991, he moved to Australia to play for Eastern Suburbs, but returned to Wigan a few weeks later without making a first grade appearance. Unable to establish a regular place in the first team ahead of Andy Gregory and Shaun Edwards, he joined Leeds later that year for a fee of £100,000. He spent one season at Leeds before moving to his hometown club Widnes in 1992.

Goulding transferred from Widnes to St Helens in 1994 for an initial fee of £135,000, plus an additional £25,000 after four international appearances. He once kicked 11 goals in a Super League match for St Helens.

Bobbie Goulding played , and scored two conversions in St. Helens' 16-25 defeat by Wigan in the 1995–96 Regal Trophy Final during the 1995–96 at Alfred McAlpine Stadium, Huddersfield on Saturday 13 January 1996.

Goulding represented England at the 1995 Rugby League World Cup. He was selected to play for England in the 1995 World Cup Final at  but Australia won the match and retained the Cup. He set the record as the highest points scorer in one game for Great Britain – 32 points V Fiji in 1996. He was the 1996 Great Britain Lions tour's top point scorer.

Goulding was sent off in the 1997 Challenge Cup fourth round match against Wigan Warriors for a high tackle on Neil Cowie during February 1997. He initially received an eight-match ban, but this was reduced to six games following an appeal. On his return to the side, he helped St. Helens win the Challenge Cup final for the second consecutive year, kicking six goals in a 32–22 victory over the Bradford Bulls. In August 1997, he was stripped of the St. Helens' captaincy for disciplinary reasons, and replaced by Chris Joynt. Two weeks later, he was sent off for the second time in the season (on this occasion for a high tackle on Leeds Rhinos prop Jamie Mathiou) and was suspended for a further four games.

He went on to play for Wakefield Trinity Wildcats and Salford City Reds before ending his career as a player-coach with Rochdale Hornets, with his final appearance as a player coming in 2005.

On 1 June 2014, Goulding came out of playing retirement (after a nine-year break) to play in for Barrow Raiders in their Championship fixture against fellow strugglers Rochdale Hornets. Goulding played with number 3+4 on his back, because the number 7 squad number was taken by Barrow Raiders Liam Campbell. Goulding helped the team to only their second victory at that point all season and lifted Barrow Raiders off the bottom of the table. He was sent off for dissent in the next fixture against Doncaster, and received a five-match suspension for the incident.

Coaching career
He joined Rochdale Hornets initially as player-coach, and his playing career ended in 2005 after a biceps injury. He left his post at Rochdale Hornets in November 2005, citing frustration at the club's financial problems. During his two seasons in charge at the National League One club he had not had a proper contract, despite impressing and twice being nominated for coach of the year.

He rejoined Rochdale Hornets as a coach in September 2007 before departing again in May 2008.

On 28 February 2009 Goulding was named the coach of France.

On 31 March 2014 Bobby took charge as head coach of Championship side Barrow Raiders with the club routed to the bottom of the league. His job is to try to keep Barrow out of the bottom 5 relegation places as the leagues are being restructured in 2015.

Financial crisis at the Wakefield Trinity Wildcats
In 2000, at the height of a financial crisis at the Wakefield Trinity Wildcats, the contracts of all players aged over 24 were terminated during September 2000. The players affected were; Andy Fisher, Bobbie Goulding, Warren Jowitt, Tony Kemp (player-coach), Steve McNamara, Francis Maloney, Martin Masella, Steve Prescott, Bright Sodje, Francis Stephenson and Glen Tomlinson.

References

External links
Statistics at wigan.rlfans.com
Statistics at saints.org.uk
2001 Super League Team-by-team guide

1972 births
Living people
Barrow Raiders coaches
Barrow Raiders players
England national rugby league team players
English rugby league coaches
English rugby league players
France national rugby league team coaches
Great Britain national rugby league team players
Huddersfield Giants players
Leeds Rhinos players
Leigh Leopards players
Rochdale Hornets coaches
Rugby league five-eighths
Rugby league halfbacks
Rugby league players from Widnes
Salford Red Devils captains
Salford Red Devils players
St Helens R.F.C. captains
St Helens R.F.C. players
Wakefield Trinity players
Widnes Vikings players
Wigan Warriors players